Sellier & Bellot is a firearms ammunition manufacturer situated in Vlašim, Czech Republic.  It is a subsidiary of the Brazilian company CBC.

Foundation 

Sellier & Bellot was founded on August 5, 1825 by a German businessman of French origins called Louis Sellier. His family had been royalists who had fled France during the French Revolution. Louis Sellier began manufacturing percussion caps for infantry firearms in a factory in Prague, Bohemia on the request of Francis I, the Emperor of Austria. Sellier was soon joined by his countryman Jean Maria Nicolaus Bellot, who led the company to quickly gain momentum.

Sellier & Bellot products soon established themselves on both European and overseas markets. As early as 1830 the manufacture of percussion caps was in excess of 60 million and peaked later in 1837 at the enormous quantity of 156 million caps.

Subsequent development
1829
A subsidiary plant in Schönebeck (Prussia) is founded.

1870
Cartridge production starts. Together with Flobert's rimfire and Lefaucheux's pin-primer cartridges, the first centrefire cartridges appear in the production program. In just a few years, the annual output grows to 10 million cartridges.

Louis Sellier died and his heirs acquired his share.

1872
Heirs of Louis Sellier convince Jean Bellot to give up management of the company and sell it. The factory brings in Czech entrepreneur Martin Hála, who soon transforms the company into a joint-stock company.

1884
Another subsidiary plant is established in Riga, Latvia (then part of Russia) and this soon covers demand for percussion caps in the whole of Russia and Scandinavia.

1893
The first trademark of Sellier & Bellot is listed in Prague.

1895
Hunting cartridge cases, quickly followed by hunting cartridges, are brought into the production program. This program is extended by copper primers for blasting works and ammunition manufacture in Škoda Pilsen.

1914–1918
During World War I the production of commercial ammunition is curbed and total capacity used to manufacture rifle and handgun cartridges for the army. The Steyr 9 mm cartridge is developed and introduced to serial production during this period. After the independent state of Czechoslovakia is founded in October 1918, the company becomes the dominant supplier of handgun ammunition for the Czechoslovak Army and police. The production of commercial ammunition for competition shooting and hunting purposes is further extended. The company expands into the Asian and South American markets where Sellier & Bellot's infantry cartridges meet with a great success.

Based on the invention of its managing director František Blechta, the company became the only manufacturer of silver azide in the world. Owing to this, the production of industrial detonators increased significantly.

1936
The company's move from Prague to Vlašim leads to further growth.

1945
Sellier & Bellot is nationalized as part of the new Czechoslovak government's introduction of a state monopoly for the manufacture of both military and commercial ammunition. The range of commercial ammunition is extended to forty rifle calibre types, ten pistol and twenty revolver types. Shot shell manufacture ranges from .410 caliber to 12 gauge. Total output soon increases fivefold. Approximately 70% of the output is for export. Original 7.62×45, 7.62×39 and 7.62×54R cartridges are successfully introduced into production to cover the demands of the Czechoslovak Army.

1964
Company starts to produce antifriction bearings.

1965
Production of packaging machines, now concentrated in the subsidiary company Sellier & Bellot, stroje Ltd. begins.

1972
Manufacture of cartridges according to valid C.I.P. standards begins.

1992
Transformation of the state-owned company to a joint-stock company – Sellier & Bellot a.s. (JSC). The company's shareholders are Czech natural and legal persons; a part of the equity is held by the company's employees.

Almost 70% of production volume is exported through the daughter company – Sellier & Bellot Trade a.s. The company's products are exported to over seventy countries.

1998
The company is granted ISO 9001 certification.

1999
Sellier & Bellot earns the bronze medal in Deutsches Waffen Journal readers' vote in the category of Ammunition.

2005
Sellier & Bellot JSC celebrates its 180th anniversary. It is not only one of the oldest engineering companies in the Czech Republic, but also one of the oldest companies in the world. It has been manufacturing products bearing its trademark uninterrupted since 1825.

2009
Sellier & Bellot is acquired by CBC of Brazil.

References

External links

Companhia Brasileira de Cartuchos
Ammunition manufacturers
Companies of Czechoslovakia
Manufacturing companies established in 1825